John Wallis Titt (1841–1910) was a late nineteenth-century English mechanical engineer and builder of a particular design of large wind engine.

Early life

Titt was born in 1841 at Elm Farm, Chitterne, Wiltshire to John Titt and Eliza Titt (née Wallis). The farm had a post mill, which he worked for his father until he left in 1865 to join Messrs Wallis, Haslan and Stevens, agricultural engineers and steam engine manufacturers of Basingstoke, Hampshire. Titt worked for them for two years as a commercial traveller. In 1867, he joined the millwrighting firm of Brown & May, based in Devizes, Wiltshire. He remained with them for five years. From 1870, Titt was an agent for Brown and May.

Later life
In 1872, Titt established himself at Portway, Devizes as an agricultural engineer, employed by Brown & May. He was also an agent for Messrs Fowler's of Leeds, Yorkshire. In 1874 he entered business on his own account and in 1876 he established the Woodcock Ironworks at Warminster. At first, he manufactured elevators.  Titt continued in business as an agricultural engineer and iron founder. In 1884, Titt manufactured his first wind engine, for the Boyton estate. Titt continued to run the firm until he retired through ill health in 1903, the year in which he exhibited three wind engines at the Royal Agricultural Societys show, Park Royal, London. He died in May 1910.

After his death, the firm was run by his two sons. At its peak, 150 people were employed. Apart from the agricultural side of the business, the firm also handled bicycles and motor cars. The firm declined until in 1929 only 25 people were employed. In the 1940s, under the management of G. T. Frost, the firm expanded again, employing 60 people in 1952. A branch was established at Frome, Somerset. The Warminster headquarters closed in 1986 but the firm continued in business in Frome until 2009.

Titt wind engines

Titt made three  main  types of wind engine: the  Woodcock, Simplex direct and the Simplex geared. After the firm was taken over by his sons, another standard type of windpump, the Imperial, was produced.

Woodcock engines

The Woodcock engine was a conventional iron windpump.

Simplex direct engines

The Simplex engines came either as direct drive or geared drive. The blades of the wind wheel were similar in design and operation to the shutters on a Spring or Patent sail. Some of the larger direct engines were turned to wind by a fantail. A single or double fantail could be had, per the customer's wishes.

Simplex geared engines

Again, a taller tower could be supplied at extra cost. The geared Simplex engines were turned into wind by a fantail.

Locations
Two remaining wind engines made by John Wallis Titt are on show at the Wind Energy Museum in Repps with Bastwick, Norfolk.

Titt wind engines are known to have been built at the following locations:- unless otherwise indicated

The name "Simplex" was independently used by an Australian windmill manufacturer (the Intercolonial Boring Company) for its windmills, with the name used to describe greatness in simplicity. The windmill and its design had no association with Titt's machines. A restored IBC Direct Acting Simplex windmill is part of the National Museum of Australia collection. It is 13 metres high with a six-metre sail diameter. The windmill drew water from the Great Artesian Basin at Kenya Station in central Queensland from the 1920s until 1988, when it was decommissioned. It was subsequently donated to the museum in 2008 and installed in 2011.

References

External links

 Kenya station windmill, National Museum of Australia

1841 births
1910 deaths
Millwrights
English mechanical engineers
People from Warminster